Exit Cave, Tasmania is a large multi entrance cave near Ida bay in southern Tasmania.

The cave is one of a number of caves along the D’Entrecasteaux River, and the system has a number of sump.  It is a candidate for the longest cave in Australia. Another contender for this title is Bullita Cave in the NT although as the cave remains not fully mapped there is no certainty which cave holds the record.

References

Southern Tasmania
Protected areas of Tasmania
Caves of Tasmania